Kung Fu Monster, previously translated as When Robbers Meet the Monster, is a 2018 Hong Kong-Chinese wuxia fantasy film co-produced and directed by Andrew Lau and starring Louis Koo, Cheney Chen, Bao Bei'er, Wang Taili, Bea Hayden, with Alex Fong and Zhou Dongyu. Production for the film began on 13 April 2017 and wrapped up on 8 June of the same year in Beijing, and was released in December 2018.

Plot
During the Wanli Emperor's reign (reigned 1572 to 1620) in the Ming dynasty, Crane Sun, a cruel supervisor of the Eastern Depot, was ordered to capture monsters that have escaped from the royal palace. At the same time, militia warrior Blade colludes with his martial arts junior Bella and female warrior Frigid gather a group of forest fighters to rob the silver from corrupt officials. However, silver was missing, while wanted criminal Ocean Feng appears along with Jianghu wanderer Cypress. As a bigger crisis comes, monsters are looking through it nearby.

Cast

Main starring
Louis Koo as Ocean Feng
Cheney Chen as Blade
Bao Bei'er as Cypress
Wang Taili as Mount
Bea Hayden as Frigid
Alex Fong as Crane Sun
Zhou Dongyu as Bella

Also starring
Wu Yue as Constable Wang
Pan Binlong as Saucy
Kong Lianshun as Dash
Liang Dawei as Crane's underling #1
Liu Hao as Crane's underling #2

Guest appearances
Ying Er
Ken Lo
Fiona Sit
Peter Ho
Sam Lee

OST

References

External links
 

2018 films
2010s action horror films
2010s historical horror films
2010s fantasy action films
2010s monster movies
Hong Kong action films
Hong Kong martial arts films
Hong Kong fantasy films
Chinese action films
Chinese martial arts films
Chinese fantasy films
Martial arts fantasy films
Wuxia films
Cantonese-language films
Films directed by Andrew Lau
Films set in the 16th century
Films set in the 17th century
Media Asia films
Polybona Films films
Films set in the Ming dynasty
Films shot in Beijing
2010s historical fantasy films
2018 martial arts films
2010s Mandarin-language films
2010s Hong Kong films